The 2012 Ondo State gubernatorial election occurred on October 20, 2012. Incumbent governor, LP's Olusegun Mimiko won election for a second term, defeating other party candidates. Mimiko received 43.79% of the total vote and won in 13 of the state's 18 LGAs, closely followed by PDP's Olusola Oke who won in two LGAs with 26.25% of total votes, while the ACN candidate, Rotimi Akeredolu, who won in three LGAs came third with 24.15% of the votes. Mimiko becomes the first Incumbent governor of Ondo State to be re-elected.

Olusegun Mimiko was the LP nominee at the primary election. His running mate was Ali Olanusi.

Electoral system
The Governor of Ondo State is elected using the plurality voting system.

Results
A total of 13 candidates registered with the Independent National Electoral Commission. LP candidate Olusegun Mimiko won the election for a second term, defeating other party candidates. Mimiko received 43.79% of the votes, defeating PDP candidate, Olusola Oke with 26.25% and ACN candidate Rotimi Akeredolu with 24.15%.

The total number of registered voters was 1,638,950, while the accredited voters were 645,597. The total votes cast was 624,659, of which 594,244 were valid votes and 30,415 were invalid votes. From across the 18 LGAs, 49.80% of the voters were male, while 50.20% were female.

By local government area
Here are the results of the election by local government area for the two major parties. 13 political parties participated in the election. Yellow represents LGAs won by Olusegun Mimiko. Green represents LGAs won by Oke.

References 

Ondo State gubernatorial elections
Gubernatorial election 2020
Ondo State gubernatorial election